Sarcina maxima is a bacterium from the genus Sarcina which has been isolated from faeces of an elephant.

References

 

Bacteria described in 1888
Clostridiaceae